The levator labii superioris alaeque nasi muscle (occasionally shortened alaeque nasi muscle) is, translated from Latin, the "lifter of both the upper lip and of the wing of the nose". The muscle is attached to the upper frontal process of the maxilla and inserts into the skin of the lateral part of the nostril and upper lip. At 44 characters, its name is longer than any other muscle's.

Overview
Historically known as Otto's muscle, it dilates the nostril and elevates the upper lip, enabling one to snarl. Elvis Presley is famous for his use of this expression, earning the muscle's nickname "The Elvis muscle". A mnemonic to remember its name is, "Little Ladies Snore All Night." Snore is used because it is the labial elevator closest to the nose. The levator labii superioris alaeque nasi is sometimes referred to as the "angular head" of the levator labii superioris muscle.

See also
 Frontalis muscle

References 

Muscles of the head and neck